Heilongjiang, a province of the People's Republic of China, is made up of the following administrative divisions.

Administrative divisions
These administrative divisions are explained in greater detail at Administrative divisions of the People's Republic of China. The following table lists only the prefecture-level and county-level divisions of Heilongjiang.

Recent changes in administrative divisions

Population composition

Prefectures

Counties

References

 
Heilongjiang